Gazargan (also Romanized as Gāzargān; also known as Gāzargāh) is a village in Tabadkan Rural District, in the Central District of Mashhad County, Razavi Khorasan Province, Iran. At the 2006 census, its population was 43, in 13 families.

References 

Populated places in Mashhad County